Shilovskoye is a rural locality (a village) in Ivanovskoye Rural Settlement, Kovrovsky District, Vladimir Oblast, Russia. The population was 14 as of 2010.

Geography 
Shilovskoye is located 32 km southeast of Kovrov (the district's administrative centre) by road. Novinki is the nearest rural locality.

References 

Rural localities in Kovrovsky District